Korti is a village in the Karmala taluka of Solapur district in Maharashtra state, India.

Demographics
Covering  and comprising 742 households at the time of the 2011 census of India, Korti had a population of 3341. There were 1753 males and 1588 females, with 343 people being aged six or younger.

References

Villages in Karmala taluka